R group may refer to:

In chemistry:
 Pendant group or side group
 Side chain
 Substituent
In mathematics:
 Tempered representation